Charles Thomas "Chuck" Mitchell (November 28, 1927 – June 22, 1992) was an American actor, singer and entertainer. He is known for his role as "Porky" in the 1981 movie Porky's and its 1985 sequel Porky's Revenge!.

Career
Mitchell is also remembered as Rocko, the mean owner of the restaurant called "Pig Burgers" in the 1985 comedy Better Off Dead.

He became well known for his role as "Porky" in the comedy movie Porky's. He would reprise the role again in the 1985 sequel Porky's Revenge!. He declined to appear in Porky's II: The Next Day as he would have had to appear completely naked in the final scene.

He starred in the TV soap opera General Hospital as Big Ralph, and in the 1981 TV series Bret Maverick, as well as the 1983 miniseries The Winds of War.

Mitchell made guest appearances on the TV shows The Fall Guy, Hill Street Blues and Remington Steele.

In some of his films, he is credited as Chuck "Porky" Mitchell.

Personal life
Mitchell had two sisters, Dorothy Farrell and Frances Mitchell.

Death
Mitchell died on June 22, 1992, in Hollywood, California from cirrhosis of the liver at the age of 64.

Filmography

Film

Television

References

External links 

 

1927 births
1992 deaths
American male film actors
American male television actors
Deaths from cirrhosis
Male actors from Connecticut
20th-century American male actors
Alcohol-related deaths in California
Burials at Riverside National Cemetery